Attorney General Peters may refer to:

John A. Peters (1822–1904), Attorney General of Maine
Charles Jeffery Peters (1773–1848), Attorney General of New Brunswick